In Inca mythology, one of the main Inca creation myths was that of the Ayar Brothers who emerged from a cave called Paqariq Tampu (also spelled Paqariqtampu) (Quechua paqariy to dawn / to be born, -q a suffix, tampu inn, lodge, hispanicized and mixed spellings Pacaritambo, Paccarectambo, Paccarec Tambo, Paccarictambo, Paccaric Tambo, Paqariq Tambo, Paccaritambo).

This "house of production" was located on the hill called Tampu T'uqu (Quechua t'uqu a niche, hole or gap in the wall, today also the modern word for window, hispanicized Tambotoco, Tamputoco). It had three windows. According to the myth, the tribe of Maras emerged from one of the niches, called Maras T'uqu (Maras tocco) by spontaneous generation. The tribe of Tampus emerged from the sut'i t'uqu window.  Manco Capac, his three Ayar brothers, and his four Mama sisters, emerged from the chief window in the middle, the qhapaq t'uqu.

Another theory held by more obscure groups, tending to dwell on the mysticism of South American Indians is that Paqariq Tampu is a quasi-mythical place believed by these historians to have been flooded by Lake Titicaca. Chronicles like the one of Guaman Poma (Quechua for hawk puma) mention Paqariq Tampu: "They say they came from Titicaca lake and from Tiahuanaco and they entered Tambo Toco and from there eight Inca brothers and sisters came out... Those eight brothers and sisters came out of Pacari Tanbo and they went to their idol huaca of Uana Cauri, coming from Collau towards the city of Cuzco". Theories base themselves mainly on tales of the Chasa, another race or tribe thought by most to be as mythical, proclaim the name to actually come from the chasa word Pàchacambo (meaning birthing place of the gods Chaca, who they believed themselves to be.)

Pachacuti visited the site and "venerated the locality and showed his feeling by festivals and sacrifices.  He placed doors of gold on the window qhapaq tu'uqu, and ordered that from that time forward the locality should be venerated by all, making it a prayer place and wak'a, whither to go to pray for oracles and to sacrifice."

References

G. Urton, The History of a Myth: Pacariqtambo and the Origin of the Inkas (Univ. of Texas Press, 1990)
Inca mythology
Cusco Region